Oreodera zikani is a species of beetle in the family Cerambycidae. It was described by Melzer in 1930. It is one of 116 species in the Oreodera genus, which are commonly known as flat-faced long-horned beetles.

References

Oreodera
Beetles described in 1930